Nonhyeon can refer to several places in South Korea.

Administrative divisions 

 Nonhyeon-dong, Gangnam-gu, Seoul.
 Nonhyeon-dong, Namdong-gu, Incheon.

Railroad stations 

 In Nonhyeon-dong, Seoul:
 Nonhyeon Station on the Seoul Subway Line 7.
 Sinnonhyeon Station on the Seoul Subway Line 9.
 In Nonhyeon-dong, Incheon:
 Incheon Nonhyeon Station on the Suin Line. It was provisionally called "Nonhyeon Curtilage (Nonhyeontaekji) Station" until its opening.
 Hogupo Station on the Suin Line. It was former "Nonhyeon Station" until the opening of the Suin Line as a part of the Seoul Metropolitan Subway system.